Kayo Henmi  (born 12 June 1979) is a Japanese freestyle skier.

She was born in Isawa, Yamanashi. She competed at the 2006 Winter Olympics, in women's aerials.

References

External links 
 

1979 births
People from Yamanashi Prefecture
Living people
Japanese female freestyle skiers
Olympic freestyle skiers of Japan
Freestyle skiers at the 2006 Winter Olympics
21st-century Japanese women